The 1995 UEFA European Under-16 Championship was the 13th edition of UEFA's European Under-16 Football Championship. Belgium hosted the championship, during 24 April – 6 May 1995. 16 teams entered the competition, and Portugal defeated Spain in the final to win the competition for the second time.

Squads

Participants

Group stage

Group A

Group B

Group C

Group D

Knockout stages

Quarterfinals

Semifinals

Third Place Playoff

Final

References
RSSSF.com
UEFA.com

1995
UEFA
UEFA
1995
April 1995 sports events in Europe
May 1995 sports events in Europe
1995 in youth association football